The All-American Girls Professional Baseball League was a circuit that began to operate in 1943. Since the only organized ball for women in the United States was softball, the league officials created a hybrid game which included features of both fast-pitch softball and baseball. Compared to softball, the crucial differences were that nine (not ten) players were used, and runners could lead off, slide and steal bases. 

In its twelve years of history the All-American Girls Professional Baseball League evolved through many stages. These differences varied from the beginning of the league, progressively extending the length of the base paths and pitching distance, while decreasing the size of the ball until the final year of play in 1954. 

For the first five years the circuit used a fastpitch underhand motion, shifted to sidearm in the 1947 season, and overhand pitching began in 1948.

Rules of play

Sources

Baseball rules
Rules